Érika González Lombídez (born 31 August 2004) is a Spanish professional footballer who plays as a midfielder for Liga F club Levante UD.

Club career
González started her career at Sporting B.

References

External links
Profile at La Liga

2004 births
Living people
Women's association football midfielders
Spanish women's footballers
People from Oriente (Asturian comarca)
Footballers from Asturias
Sporting de Gijón (women) players
Levante UD Femenino players
Primera División (women) players
Segunda Federación (women) players
21st-century Spanish women